Matthew Freeman Brass (born January 19, 1978) is an American politician who has served in the Georgia State Senate from the 28th district since 2017.

After Joe Biden won the 2020 presidential election in Georgia, Brass backed attempts to review the presidential vote in Georgia over the potential fraud in many of the counties across the state. Lt. Gov. Geoff Duncan subsequently demoted Brass from being chairman of the committee that draws the political map in Georgia to the lesser posting of chairman of the banking committee.

References

1978 births
Living people
People from Newnan, Georgia
Republican Party Georgia (U.S. state) state senators
21st-century American politicians